Mt. Zion Rosenwald School, also known as Mt. Zion-Rosenwald Colored School, is a historic Rosenwald School building located near Florence, Florence County, South Carolina.  It was built in 1925, and is a rectangular frame building with tall exterior windows. It is a "two or three teacher" school building.  Construction of the project was funded in part by the Julius Rosenwald Fund, which helped build more than 5,300 black school buildings across the south from 1917 to 1932.

It was listed on the National Register of Historic Places in 2001.

References

Rosenwald schools in South Carolina
African-American history of South Carolina
School buildings on the National Register of Historic Places in South Carolina
School buildings completed in 1925
Buildings and structures in Florence County, South Carolina
National Register of Historic Places in Florence County, South Carolina
1925 establishments in South Carolina